Jaroslav Špillar (11 October 1869, Plzeň – 20 November 1917, Dobřany) was a Czech artist who specialized in painting the Chodové ("Rangers").

Life 
He was the son of a financial officer. His brothers Karel and Rudolf also became artists. In 1885, he became one of the first students at the School of Applied Arts in Prague, where he studied under František Ženíšek and Jakub Schikaneder. He then spent five years at the Academy of Fine Arts with Maxmilián Pirner. This was followed by the traditional study trip to Italy, as well as several other places abroad.

In 1888, he had become interested in the Chod region and settled there in 1891. At first, he lived in Postřekov, then moved to the small village of Trávniky, where the local residents gave him the nickname Trávníček. Later (in 1902), he built a villa in Pec where he hosted many celebrities. Alfons Mucha spent his honeymoon there in 1906.

Sadly, in 1904, Špillar began to display signs of a potentially serious mental disorder. He eventually had to be committed to the psychiatric hospital in Dobřany, where he died.

Selected paintings

Sources/Further reading 
 Bucha, František X.: Jaroslav Špillar. Studie života a díla, Baar Company, Domažlice (1946).
 Čadík, Jindřich: Průvodce výstavou obrazů Jaroslava a Karla Špillara:k výročí osmdesátých narozenin Jar. Špillara a k upomínce desetiletí od smrti Karla Špillara, Exhibition catalog of the Museum of West Bohemia in Plzeň (1949)
 Jaroslav Špillar : seznam prací na výstavě jeho r. 1903 v Domažlicích se životopisem, Exhibition catalog of the Domažlice Museum (1903)  
 Souborná výstava Jaroslava Špillara / Topičův salon v Praze 15.1.–15.2.1899, Exhibition catalog, Topičův salon, Prague (1899)
 Wenig, Jan: Malíř chodského lidu Jaroslav Špillar. Regional Publishers, Plzeň (1960).

External links

 Toulavá Kamera (Wandering Camera, Czech Television): Search results for "Jaroslav Špillar  (videos)
 Špillar Brothers Gallery at the Muzeum Chodska

1869 births
1917 deaths
Artists from Plzeň
19th-century Czech painters
Czech male painters
20th-century Czech painters
19th-century Czech male artists
20th-century Czech male artists